The Angelic Conversation may refer to:

The Angelic Conversation (film), a 1985 film directed by Derek Jarman
The Angelic Conversation (album), a soundtrack album released by Coil for the Derek Jarman film